Events in the year 2018 in Kyrgyzstan.

Incumbents
 President – Sooronbay Jeenbekov 
 Prime Minister – Sapar Isakov (until 19 April), Mukhammedkalyi Abylgaziev (from 20 April)

Events
February 9–25: Kyrgyzstan took part in the 2018 Winter Olympics in PyeongChang, South Korea.
April 19: Prime Minister Sapar Isakov is ousted as Prime Minister of Kyrgyzstan from a parliamentary vote of no confidence.

Deaths

2 January – Jyrgalbek Kalmamatov, politician (b. 1972).
4 December – Kadyrzhan Batyrov, businessman and politician (b. 1956).

References

 
2010s in Kyrgyzstan
Years of the 21st century in Kyrgyzstan
Kyrgyzstan
Kyrgyzstan